James M. Hotchkiss (May 27, 1812 - May 7, 1877) was a Vermont farmer, businessman, and politician.  He served in the Vermont House of Representatives and Vermont Senate, and was chosen to serve as the Senate's President pro tem.

Biography
James Madison Hotchkiss was born in Georgia, Vermont on May 27, 1812, the son of James Hotchkiss and Alice (Story) Hotchkiss.  He was educated in Georgia, and in 1832 he purchased a farm in Fairfax in partnership with his brother Hiram.   They operated the farm for several years, after which James Hotchkiss established himself as a merchant in Fairfax.   He later moved to Waterville, where he continued his mercantile career, and returned to Fairfax after 20 years as a Waterville resident.

Hotchkiss was involved in politics as an advocate of abolishing slavery, and as the abolition movement grew and coalesced, he moved successively from the Opposition Party to the Free Soil Party to the Republican Party.  He represented Waterville in the Vermont House of Representatives in the early 1850s, and served as one of the assistant judges of Lamoille County from 1851 to 1853.  Hotchkiss served in the Vermont Senate from 1856 to 1857, and was chosen to serve as the Senate's President pro tem in 1856.

During the American Civil War, Hotchkiss supported the Union.  During and immediately after the conflict, he took part in political conventions of the Unionist Party, which aimed to fuse Republicans and pro-Union Democrats in support of the war effort and Reconstruction measures that were less severe than those proposed by Radical Republican movement.

After returning to Fairfax, Hotchkiss remained active in politics as a delegate to numerous Republican conventions, and in local offices including Town Meeting Moderator.  He was involved in managing his business interests until 1874, after which he lived in retirement in Fairfax.

Death and burial
Hotchkiss died in Fairfax on May 7, 1877.   He was buried at Sanderson Corners Cemetery in Fairfax.

Family
In 1835, Hotchkiss married Mariel Story.  She died in 1851, and later that year he married Harriet Horsford of Cambridge.  With his first wife, Hotchkiss was the father of two children, Hiram J. (1841-1851) and James M. Jr. (1842-1863).  Another son, also named Hiram, was born in 1837 and died sometime before 1841.

Hotchkiss' brother Cyrus was a member of the Vermont Senate, and his nephew Cephas served in the Vermont House of Representatives.

References

Sources

Books

Newspapers

Internet

External links

1812 births
1877 deaths
People from Georgia, Vermont
People from Fairfax, Vermont
People from Lamoille County, Vermont
19th-century American politicians
People of Vermont in the American Civil War
Vermont Free Soilers
Vermont Oppositionists
Vermont state court judges
Republican Party members of the Vermont House of Representatives
Republican Party Vermont state senators
Presidents pro tempore of the Vermont Senate
Burials in Vermont
19th-century American judges